Romeo Venturelli (9 December 1938 – 2 April 2011) was an Italian racing cyclist. He won stage 2 of the 1960 Giro d'Italia.

Major results
1957
 1st Piccolo Giro di Lombardia
1959
 1st Gran Premio della Liberazione
 3rd Overall Peace Race
1st Stages 4a (ITT), 8 & 12a (ITT)
1960
 1st Trofeo Baracchi (with Diego Ronchini)
 1st Stage 2 (ITT) Giro d'Italia
 1st Stage 6b (ITT) Paris–Nice
 1st Stage 2 Menton–Roma
 6th Giro di Lombardia
 9th Overall Tour de Romandie
1st Stage 1
1965
 1st Gran Piemonte
 2nd Overall Giro di Sardegna
 2nd Grand Prix de Saint-Raphael
 3rd Milano–Torino
 10th Trofeo Laigueglia

References

External links
 

1938 births
2011 deaths
Italian male cyclists
Italian Giro d'Italia stage winners
Sportspeople from the Province of Modena
Cyclists from Emilia-Romagna